William Egan may refer to:

William Egan (footballer) (1872–1946), Welsh international footballer
William Egan (gangster) (1884–1921), St. Louis politician and organized crime figure
William Egan (hurler) (born 1990), Irish hurler
William A. Egan (1914–1984), American Democratic politician; Governor of Alaska, 1959–1966 and 1970–1974
William B. Giles Egan (1824–1878), Justice of the Louisiana Supreme Court
William Bradshaw Egan (1808–1860), Irish American physician and politician
William F. Egan (born 1936), American electrical engineer
William Henry Egan, member of parliament for Birkenhead West, 1923–1924 and 1929–1931
William P. Egan, American businessman and investor